Gorongosa District is a district of Sofala Province in Mozambique. The principal town is Gorongosa. The district is located in the northwest of the province, and borders with Maringué District in the north, Cheringoma District in the east, Muanza District in the southeast, Nhamatanda District in the south, and with Macossa and Gondola Districts of Manica Province in the west. It has a population of 116,912 as of 2007.

Geography
The principal rivers of the district are the Vanduzi River and the Chitunga River in the west and the Vunduzi River and the Nhandu River in the east.

According to the Köppen climate classification, the district are in two climate zones, tropical wet dry (aw) and, in the mountains (Serra de Gorongosa) tropical temperate humid (cw).

The district is dominated by the Gorongosa National Park, which is located in the East African Rift.

Demographics
As of 2005, 48% of the population of the district was younger than 15 years. 24% of the population spoke Portuguese. The most common mothertongue among the population was Cindau. 82% were analphabetic, mostly women.

Administrative divisions
The district is divided into three postos, Gorongosa (two localities), Nhamadzi (one locality), and Vanduzi (one locality).

Economy
1% of the households in the district have access to electricity.

Agriculture
In the district, there are 15,000 farms which have on average  of land. The main agricultural products are corn, cassava, cowpea, peanut, sorghum, rice, sugar cane, and sweet potato.

Transportation
There is a road network in the district which includes  stretch of the national road E1 passing through Gorongosa.

References

Districts in Sofala Province